Emilio Berroa (born 3 October 1946) is a Dominican Republic weightlifter. He competed in the men's light heavyweight event at the 1972 Summer Olympics.

References

1946 births
Living people
Dominican Republic male weightlifters
Olympic weightlifters of the Dominican Republic
Weightlifters at the 1972 Summer Olympics
Place of birth missing (living people)
20th-century Dominican Republic people